The Plurinational Electoral Organ is the independent electoral branch of the government of Bolivia. It replaced the National Electoral Court in 2010.

Composition and function

The OEP consists of the 7-member Supreme Electoral Tribunal, the nine Departmental Electoral Tribunals, Electoral Judges, the anonymously selected Juries at Election Tables, and Electoral Notaries, as well as three operative branches. Its operations are mandated by the Constitution and regulated by the Electoral Regime Law (Law 026). The seat of the Organ and of the Supreme Electoral Tribunal are in La Paz; while the ruling MAS-IPSP party offered the headquarters to Sucre during the controversy over capital status during the 2006–07 Constituent Assembly, negotiations were inconclusive. In June 2010, the Bolivian Senate rejected calls from Chuquisaca parliamentarians to place the headquarters in Sucre.

The Organ's operative branches are the Civil Register Service (Sereci), the Intercultural Service for Strengthening Democracy (Sifde), and the Technical Unit for Oversight (UTF). The Civil Register Service is charged with continually maintaining the electoral rolls and consolidates the functions of registering birth, marriage, death, biometric identification, and residence. The UTF audits and ensures the transparency of parties and political organizations.

The first election to be supervised by the new Organ was the judicial elections of late 2011, followed by special municipal elections.

Supreme Electoral Tribunal and Departmental Electoral Tribunals

The Supreme Electoral Tribunal oversees elections nationwide via the nine Departmental Electoral Tribunals ( (TEDs)), one for each of the Bolivian departmental regions (Beni, Cochabamba, Chuquisaca, La Paz, Oruro, Pando, Tarija, Potosí, and Santa Cruz) which are responsible for elections at the local level. The TSE consists of seven members, six of whom are chosen by the Plurinational Legislative Assembly and one designated by the president. There are also six alternate members chosen by the Assembly. By law it must contain at least two people of indigenous background and at least three women. They serve in this position for a period of six years. The TEDs consist of five members each of which one must be from an indigenous group or nation and at least two must be women.

The members of the TSE are as follows:

Previous members 

The first TSE consisted of Wilfredo Ovando (President), selected by Evo Morales, along with Irineo Valentín Zuna, Ramiro Paredes, Wilma Velasco, Fanny Rosario Rivas Rojas, Dina Agustina Chuquimia Alvarado and Marco Daniel Ayala Soria.

The previous members of the TSE were elected in 2015 and were María Eugenia Choque (President), Antonio Costas, José Luis Exeni, Idelfonso Mamani, Dunia Sandoval and Katia Uriona.

Alleged electoral fraud of 2019

References

Government of Bolivia
Elections in Bolivia
Bolivia